Gilmer may refer to:

Places in the United States 
Gilmer, Illinois
Gilmer, Roanoke, Virginia
Gilmer, Texas
Gilmer, Washington
Gilmer, West Virginia
Gilmer County, Georgia
Gilmer County, West Virginia
Gilmer Township, Adams County, Illinois
Lake Gilmer, Texas

Other uses 
Gilmer (surname)
Gilmer Hernandez, former U.S. border deputy
USS Gilmer, a World War II destroyer and a patrol boat

See also